Upper Bavaria is one of the seven administrative districts of Bavaria, Germany.

Geography 
Upper Bavaria is located in the southern portion of Bavaria, and is centered on the city of Munich, both state capital and seat of the district government. Because of this, it is by far the most populous administrative division in Bavaria. It is subdivided into four planning regions (Planungsverband): Ingolstadt, Munich, Bayerisches Oberland (Bavarian Highland), and Südostoberbayern (South East Upper Bavaria). The name 'Upper Bavaria' refers to the relative position on the Danube and its tributaries: downstream, Upper Bavaria is followed by Lower Bavaria, then Upper Austria, and subsequently Lower Austria. It consists of 20 districts and 500 municipalities (including three cities).

Landkreise (districts):

 Altötting
 Bad Tölz-Wolfratshausen
 Berchtesgadener Land
 Dachau
 Ebersberg
 Eichstätt
 Erding
 Freising
 Fürstenfeldbruck
 Garmisch-Partenkirchen
 Landsberg
 Miesbach
 Mühldorf
 Munich (München)
 Neuburg-Schrobenhausen
 Pfaffenhofen
 Rosenheim
 Starnberg
 Traunstein
 Weilheim-Schongau

Kreisfreie Städte (district-free cities):
 Ingolstadt
 Munich (München)
 Rosenheim

Population 
Historical Population of Upper Bavaria:

Economy 
The Gross domestic product (GDP) of the region was 273.7 billion € in 2018, accounting for 8.2% of German economic output. GDP per capita adjusted for purchasing power was 53,900 € or 179% of the EU27 average in the same year. The GDP per employee was 134% of the EU average. This makes Upper Bavaria one of the richest regions in Europe.

History 
The duchy of Upper Bavaria was created for the first time with the First Bavarian partition in 1255 under duke Louis II, but there was no exact correlation between this duchy and the current territory. After the reunification in 1340 Bavaria was divided again in 1349, and in 1392 the duchies Bavaria-Munich and Bavaria-Ingolstadt were created in Upper Bavaria. In 1505 Bavaria was permanently reunited. For administrative purposes, Bavaria was split into Rentämter (plural of ). Upper Bavaria consisted of the Rentamt Munich and Rentamt Burghausen.

After the founding of the Kingdom of Bavaria the state was totally reorganised and, in 1808, divided into 15 administrative districts (Regierungsbezirke (singular Regierungsbezirk)), in Bavaria called (Kreise (singular Kreis)). They were created in the fashion of the French departements, quite even in size and population, and named after their main rivers. In the following years, due to territorial changes (e. g. loss of Tyrol, addition of the Palatinate), the number of districts was reduced to 8. One of these was the Isarkreis (Isar District). In 1837 king Ludwig I of Bavaria renamed the Kreise after historical names, and tribes. This also involved border changes or territorial swaps. Thus, the Isarkreis changed to Upper Bavaria.

Instead of a Rentamt-style mere administrational unit, the newly created districts became predecessors of modern regional self-government, building a political and administrational link in-between the Bavarian state as a whole and the local authorities.

Main sights 

Featured former residence cities are the capital Munich, Ingolstadt and Neuburg an der Donau and the diocesan towns of Freising and Eichstätt. Interesting townscapes are found at Landsberg am Lech, Wasserburg am Inn and Burghausen and further south Bad Reichenhall and Berchtesgaden.

The highest mountain in Upper Bavaria, Zugspitze, offers an incomparable panoramic view of the Alps. Nestled in forested mountain ranges, the lakes Tegernsee, Schliersee, and Spitzingsee, are idyllically situated. The larger lakes, like Starnberger See, Ammersee (south-west of Munich), and Chiemsee further to the east, all situated in the pre-alpine uplands, offer regular Passenger services on steamers.

Sacred art treasures can be found in the monasteries Andechs, Schäftlarn, Fürstenfeld, Benediktbeuern, Polling and Ettal and in the Wieskirche. Among popular excursions in Upper Bavaria are the Koenigssee with the Sanctuary of St Bartholomew's and mount Watzmann, the royal castles of Ludwig II, Linderhof and Herrenchiemsee in Chiemsee, the Burghausen Castle and the castle Hohenaschau. The most important places of pilgrimage are Altoetting and Tuntenhausen.

References

External links

 Official website Regierung von Oberbayern 
 Official website Bezirk Oberbayern 
 Tourism website 

 
NUTS 2 statistical regions of the European Union
Government regions of Germany